The Minister of Immigration was established in 1872 as the Secretary for Crown Lands and Immigration. The minister appointed was William Fitzherbert but when replaced later in the year by Maurice O'Rorke, the title was changed to Minister of Immigration.

The current minister is Michael Wood, while the Associate Minister of Immigration is Ginny Andersen.

Functions and responsibilities
The Minister of Immigration is responsible for leading the policy and strategic direction of the New Zealand immigration system and setting the rules and criteria for the granting of visas and entry permission, and making decisions in individual cases. The Minister of Immigration receives operational support from Immigration New Zealand, which is part of the Ministry of Business, Innovation and Employment (MBIE). MBIE's Immigration Policy Team advises the Minister on policy matters. The Immigration Minister also has jurisdiction over both the Immigration Advisers Authority, which provides licenses to service people who provide immigration advice to prospective immigrants, and the Immigration Advisers Complaints and Disciplinary Tribunal. The Minister of Immigration is regulated by the Immigration Act 2009 and the Immigration Advisers Licensing Act.

List of ministers 
The following ministers have held the office of Minister of Immigration.

Key

Notes

References  

Lists of government ministers of New Zealand